Ethnician is the band formed by Yvo Abadi (Percussion/Drums), Miguel Saboga (vocals and Percussion), Igor Nikitinsky, Garbis Baharian (Samplers) of Dirty District. their music falls into the category of  World Music, Dub and Drum and Bass but also goes into Metal, Reggae and Dance styles also. Discovered by the Printemps de Bourges Festival Network, Revelation of the Pop-Komm 98 according to the German press, the band choose to record their  first album in an abandoned movie theater located in the African district of Paris.  the name Ethnician was chosen basically because each is from a different ethnic background: Miguel was born in Portugal, Igor was born in Russia, Garbis is from Armenia and Yvo is from Egypt. Recently the band has apparently split and Miguel and Yvo are currently in another Ethnician type band, the heavy percussion-based BOX OHM Station

Discography 

Self Titled (1999)
USS (Universal Sound System)
Moussaï
Growing Seeds
Dynamite #3
Medicine Man
Think Positiv
A Test
Dub#2
Complaint
Welcome To Fantasy Island
Dynamite
Ate Pode Aleijar

they also appear on Tibet Libre (with a calloboration with a monk named Lama Urgyen Dorje, who provides chants for the song) an album based on the International Tibet Independence Movement campaign, Remixes Stereo Stress with come with us (you better!) and French Dub Connection with extended version of USS.

Websites 
http://www.myspace.com/ethnician
http://www.myspace.com/ethnician2

French musical groups